Dollar is a small town with a population of 2,800 people in Clackmannanshire, Scotland.

Toponymy
Possible interpretations are that Dollar is derived from Doilleir, an Irish and Scots Gaelic word meaning dark and gloomy, or from various words in Pictish: 'Dol' (field) + 'Ar' (arable) or Dol (valley) + Ar (high). Another derivation is from Dolar, 'haugh place' (cf Welsh dôl 'meadow'. This word was borrowed from British or Pictish into Scottish Gaelic as dail 'water-meadow, haugh'). John Everett-Heath derives it as 'Place of the Water Meadow' from the Celtic dôl 'water meadow' and ar 'place'.<ref>{{cite book|title=The Concise Dictionary of World Place-Names |chapter=Dollar |edition=2 |publisher=Oxford University Press |date=2012 |isbn=9780199580897 |url=http://www.oxfordreference.com/view/10.1093/acref/9780199580897.001.0001/acref-9780199580897-e-8538?rskey=2DcKF5&result=2&q=Dollar }}</ref>

History

The 500-year-old Castle Campbell stands overlooking the town, sitting on a forward projection of rock on the south side of the Ochil Hills. The castle was the lowland seat of the Duke of Argyll, where Mary, Queen of Scots once stayed in the 16th century.

The original town (of which parts still survive) stands on the sloping ground beneath the castle, in what is now the north-east section of the town. Buildings here are general stone built and two storeys high. The oldest buildings date from the mid-17th century and several 18th century buildings exist. Development spread to the west and south through the 19th century.

The construction of Dollar Academy in the early 19th century, with its extensive grounds created a refocus westwards.

Around 1840 the construction of a new road to Muckhart on lower ground south of the original route, created the current main east–west street. This quickly became the new "town centre" and the focus of shops and public activity.

The town has two war memorials, one for each world war. In the grounds of the academy a bronze figure with outstretched hands by George Henry Paulin faces westwards and commemorates the fallen of the First World War. This also has names added for Northern Ireland.

A small museum run by volunteers contains a collection of local items, and much information about the former Devon Valley Railway, which closed to passengers in 1964. The town is now largely a dormitory community for people who work in Stirling and further afield (e.g. Glasgow and Edinburgh).

Location and transport
It is one of the Hillfoots Villages, situated between the Ochil Hills range to the north and the River Devon to the south. The Devon Valley Railway linking Alloa and Kinross closed to passengers in 1964 and to freight in 1973.

Economy
Attempts were made to mine lead and copper in Dollar Glen from the 18th century and possibly earlier, but these were of no economic significance. Coal mining in the area began around the same time and, until 1973, supplied the Kincardine Power Station, and later, the Longannet Power Station with coal from the Upper Hirst seam. A tiny private non-NCB coal mine operated from the Harviestoun estate from the mid-1970s, partly filling the gap that the closed NCB left, whilst there was still local demand for coal.

In common with the other Hillfoots Villages, the textiles industry played an important part in the town's development. The Harviestoun Brewery was established west of Dollar in 1985, before its move to Alva.

Governance
From 1891 to 1975 the town had its own council.  It is now within Clackmannanshire council area.  It forms part of the Clackmannanshire East ward which includes Clackmannan, Comely Bank, Dollar & Muckhart. In the 2017 local elections, residents of the ward elected three councillors—one each from the Scottish National Party, the Labour Party and the Conservative Party.

Provosts
Dollar had a provost from 1891 to 1975. The provosts were:
 James Beveridge Henderson (1891–1893)
 David Westwood (1893–1896)
 Richard Malcolm FRSGS (1896–1899)
 John Drysdale (1899–1902)
 M Fisher (1902–1908)
 James Benson Green (1908–1913) and (1919–1925)
 Lavinia Malcolm (1913–1919), wife of Richard Malcolm (above), the first and only female Provost
 Cpt Stewart Fairweather Butchart MC (1925–1931)
 C Allsopp (1931–1937)
 R Waddell (1937–1939)
 J Scott (1939–1943)
 P Walton (1943–1946)
 Alexander McLean Cowan (1946–1950)
 J Crawford Shaw (1950–1953)
 J Hewitt (1953–1956)
 J Muckersie (1956–1962)
 J M Miller (1962–1965)
 H Moss (1965–1968)
 Dr William Young Galloway (1968–1971) the town GP
 E M M Breingan (1971–1975)

Notable people

 William Auld (1924–2006) poet and Esperanto author,  nominated three times for the Nobel Prize in Literature, lived in Dollar until his death
 According to the Pictish Chronicle, Amlaíb Conung, the first Norse king of Dublin, was killed in a battle fought at Dollar around 874, when Constantine I was the king of Scotland.
 David Taylor (1817–1867) illegitimate poet in the Scots tongue born in Dollar
 James Legge, Scottish sinologist
 Dollar Academy was founded in 1818 with a bequest from a Dollar native, Captain John McNabb, who had allegedly made his fortune in the slave trade. Amongst the many notable pupils at the academy are James Dewar, the inventor of the vacuum flask; the grandsons of Haile Selassie I of Ethiopia; the second Presiding Officer (Speaker) of the Scottish Parliament, George Reid; BBC Gaza correspondent Alan Johnston; and political journalist for The Scotsman, the News of the World and The Spectator magazines, Fraser Nelson.
 Lavinia Malcolm, Provost of Dollar between 1913 and 1919, was both the first lady provost and first female town councilor in Scotland (see Dollar Town Council 1891–1975). 
 Alan Longmuir, of Bay City Rollers fame, lived just east of Dollar and owned and operated the Dollar Arms public house for a time.
 In the late 1990s, Michael Kulas and Saul Davies, musicians in the English rock group James, also resided and worked out of the old Tea House Cottage, now known as Brewlands, next to Castle Campbell.
 The Scottish author Iain Banks studied at the nearby University of Stirling and, in an interview for The South Bank Show in 1997, spoke about using the landscape above Dollar as inspiration for his novels (in particular A Song of Stone'').
 The biologist Alan Grafen
 The artist Patrick Syme
 Internationalist footballer, Steven Caulker's eligibility to play for Scotland is from his grandmother Jessie hailing from Dollar
 Rev James Aitken Wylie, minister of the Secessionist Church in Dollar from 1831 to 1843
 Jazz pianist Fergus McCreadie lived in Dollar while growing up.

Education

Dollar Academy is a fee paying school.

Sport
Dollar is home of the Dollar Glen Football Club, an 18-hole golf course (notable for its steep inclines and lack of bunkers), a tennis club, a squash club, a bowling club, and a cricket club. The Ochil Hills that overlook Dollar provide opportunities for mountain biking.

Religion

There are three churches, one Church of Scotland, one Scottish Episcopal Church and Ochil Hills Community Church which meets in the Civic Centre.

Twin towns
Dollar is twinned with the French town of La Ville-aux-Dames, which lies just outside Tours in the Loire Valley.

References

External links

 Historical information on Dollar from the Vision of Britain website

 
Hillfoots Villages
Mining communities in Scotland
Parishes in Clackmannanshire
Towns in Clackmannanshire